Wiiija was a British independent record label founded in 1988 by staff from the Rough Trade Shop in Notting Hill, London. The name Wiiija is a corruption of W11 1JA, the postcode of the Rough Trade Shop in Talbot Street.

The label was notable for introducing the band Therapy? and releasing the first records by Silverfish, Huggy Bear and Cornershop. Notable later releases included Free Kitten and Bis while the commercial success of Cornershop from 1997 rewarded the label's long-term support.

Wiiija became loosely associated with the early UK riot grrrl scene as a result of releases by Huggy Bear and Blood Sausage, as well as the Some Hearts Paid To Lie EP which featured Comet Gain, Skinned Teen, Linus and Pussycat Trash. Labelmates Cornershop can be seen along with Huggy Bear and Blood Sausage in the 1994 tour documentary Getting Close To Nothing.

In 1996 it became a subsidiary of Beggars Banquet Records and remained active until the early 2000s.

Artists

 Action Swingers 
 Anjali
 Bis
 Blood Sausage
 Brassy
 Comet Gain
 Cornershop
 Fabric
 Free Kitten
 Jacob's Mouse
 Loveblobs
 Mucho Macho
 Silverfish
 Sgt Rock
 Sun Carriage
 Terminal Cheesecake
 Terry Edwards
 Therapy?
 Thule
 Velocette
 Whistler

See also
 List of record labels
 List of independent UK record labels

References

Other sources
Cavanagh, David. The Creation Records Story: My Magpie Eyes Are Hungry for the Prize. London: Virgin Books, 2000. .
Young, Rob. Rough Trade. Black Dog Publishing. 

Record labels established in 1988
British independent record labels
Beggars Group
Indie rock record labels
Defunct record labels of the United Kingdom